The 2020 IIHF World Championship Division I was a scheduled international ice hockey tournament run by the International Ice Hockey Federation.

The Group A tournament was scheduled to be held in Ljubljana, Slovenia and the Group B tournament in Katowice, Poland from 27 April to 3 May 2020. However, on 17 March 2020 IIHF announced the cancellation of both tournaments following the COVID-19 pandemic.

Group A tournament

Participants

Match officials
7 referees and 7 linesmen were selected for the tournament.

Standings

Results
All times are local (UTC+2).

Group B tournament

Participants

Match officials
Four referees and seven linesmen were selected for the tournament.

Standings

Results
All times are local (UTC+2).

References

External links
Group A website
Group B website

2020
Division I
2020 IIHF World Championship Division I
2020 IIHF World Championship Division I
Sports competitions in Ljubljana
Sports competitions in Katowice
2020 in Slovenian sport
2020 in Polish sport
April 2020 sports events in Europe
May 2020 sports events in Europe
Ice hockey events cancelled due to the COVID-19 pandemic